Ming Antu's infinite series expansion of trigonometric functions. Ming Antu, a court mathematician of the Qing dynasty did extensive work on the infinite series expansion of trigonometric functions in his masterpiece Geyuan Milü Jiefa (Quick Method of Dissecting the Circle and Determination of The Precise Ratio of the Circle). Ming Antu built geometrical models based on a major arc of a circle and the nth dissection of the major arc. In Fig 1, AE is the major chord of arc ABCDE, and AB, BC, CD, DE are its nth equal segments. If chord AE = y, chord AB = BC = CD = DE = x, the task was to find chord y as the infinite series expansion of chord x. He studied the cases of n = 2, 3, 4, 5, 10, 100, 1000 and 10000 in great detail in volumes 3 and 4 of Geyuan Milü Jiefa.

Historical background
In 1701, French Jesuit missionary Pierre Jartoux (1669-1720) came to China, and he brought along three infinite series expansions of trigonometric functions by Isaac Newton and J. Gregory:

However, Jartoux did not bring along the method for deriving these infinite series. Ming Antu suspected that the Europeans did not want to share their secrets, and hence he was set to work on it. He worked on and off for thirty years and completed a manuscript called Geyuan Milü Jiefa. He created geometrical models for obtaining trigonometric infinite series, and not only found the method for deriving the above three infinite series, but also discovered six more infinite series. In the process, he discovered and applied Catalan numbers.

Two-segment chord

Figure 2 is Ming Antu's model of a 2-segment chord. Arc BCD is a part of a circle with unit (r = 1) radius. AD is the main chord, arc BCD is bisected at C, draw lines BC, CD, let BC = CD = x and let radius AC = 1.

Apparently,  

Let EJ = EF, FK = FJ; extend BE straight to L, and let EL = BE; make BF = BE, so F is inline with AE. Extended BF to M, let BF = MF; connect LM, LM apparently passes point C. The inverted triangle BLM along BM axis into triangle BMN, such that C coincident with G, and point L coincident with point N. The Invert triangle NGB along BN axis into triangle; apparently BI = BC.

 

BM bisects CG and let BM = BC; join GM, CM; draw CO = CM to intercept BM at O; make MP = MO; make NQ = NR, R is the intersection of BN and AC. ∠EBC = 1/2 ∠CAE = 1/2 ∠EAB;  ∠EBM = ∠EAB; thus we obtain a series of similar triangles: ABE, BEF, FJK, BLM, CMO, MOP, CGH and triangle CMO = triangle EFJ;

 

  namely 

 

So ,

and 

Because kite-shaped ABEC and BLIN are similar,.

 

 

  and  
 Let  
 

  
  
  
Thus   or  
 Further: .

 
then
 

 Square up the above equation on both sides and divide by 16: 
  
 

And so on
 .

Add up the following two equations to eliminate  items:

 

 

 

 (after eliminated  item).

......................................

 

Expansion coefficients of the numerators: 1, 1, 2, 5, 14, 42, 132 ...... (see Figure II Ming Antu original figure bottom line, read from right to left) are the Catalan numbers; Ming Antu discovered the Catalan number.

Thus:

  

Ming Antu pioneered the use of recursion relations in Chinese mathematics

 

  
 

substituted into 

Finally he obtained
  
 

In Figure 1
BAE angle = α, BAC angle = 2α 
× x = BC = sinα 
× q = BL = 2BE = 4sin (α /2) 
× BD = 2sin (2α) 
Ming Antu obtained  
 That is
  
 

 
 Ie

Three-segment chord

As shown in Fig 3,BE is a whole arc chord, BC = CE = DE = an are three arcs of equal portions. Radii AB = AC = AD = AE = 1. Draw lines BC, CD, DE, BD, EC; let BG=EH = BC, Bδ = Eα = BD, then triangle Cαβ = Dδγ; while triangle Cαβ is similar to triangle BδD.

As such: 
 , 

 

 

Eventually, he obtained

Four-segment chord

Let  denotes the length of the main chord, and  let the length of four equal segment chord =x,

+......

.
Trigonometry meaning:

.

Five-segment chord

that is
。

Ten-segment chord

From  here on, Ming Antu stop building geometrical model, he carried out his computation 
by pure algebraic manipulation of  infinite series.

Apparently  ten segments can be considered as a composite 5 segment, with each segment in turn  consist of two subsegments.

,

He computed the third and fifth power of infinite series  in the above equation, and obtained:

+......

Hundred-segment chord

A hundred segment arc's chord can be considered as composite 10 segment-10 subsegments, thus
sustutde  into , after manipulation with infinite series he obtained:

Thousand-segment chord

......

Ten-thousand-segment chord
............

When number of segments approaches infinity
After obtained the infinite series for n=2, 3, 5, 10, 100, 1000, and 10000 segments, Ming Antu went on to handle the case when n approaches infinity.

y100, y1000 and y10000 can be rewritten as:

..........

..............

..................

He noted that when n approaches infinity, the denominators 24.000000240000002400, 24.000002400000218400×80 approach 24 and  24×80  respectively, and  when n -> infinity, na (100a, 1000a, 1000a) becomes the length of the arc;  hence

.....

Ming Antu then performed an infinite series reversion and expressed the arc in terms of its chord

............

References

 Luo   A Modern Chinese Translation of Ming Antu's Geyuan Milv Jifa, translated and annotated by Luo Jianjin, Inner Mongolia Education Press 1998(明安图原著 罗见今译注 《割圆密率捷法》 内蒙古教育出版社  This is the only modern Chinese translation of Ming Antu's book, with detailed annotation with modern mathematical symbols). 
 Yoshio Mikami The Development of Mathematics in China and Japan, Leipzig, 1912

Chinese mathematics